Be My Baby is a 1997 play by British playwright Amanda Whittington, first produced at the Soho Theatre in London.  Since the initial performances a number of different productions have been mounted, including in Salisbury Playhouse, Oldham Coliseum, Hull Truck Theatre and the Dukes Theatre, Lancaster.  A new production opened in Derby on 29 April 2011. The playscript was published by Nick Hern Books and set in England in 1964.

The protagonist of this play is a 19-year-old girl called Mary. Her mother (Mrs. Adams) discovers that Mary is seven months pregnant and sends her to a religious mother-baby home. In 1964, the year the play has been set, mother and baby homes were introduced for unmarried girls who had gotten pregnant, a situation which was heavily frowned upon as it mostly brought dishonour upon the family. This meant that these girls had to hide their children and were not allowed out in public as they would be scorned for their states. These girls were laughed at, made inferior and were simply not accepted by society, and the aim of these homes was to keep them out of the public eye.  Other pregnant girls staying at the home are Queenie, Norma and Dolores. Queenie is a street-smart girl with a past and also dreams of being a singer, Dolores is a dreamer whilst Norma is not very bright. Each of them is forced to come to terms with their pregnancy, and through the time that they spend at the home, not only do they learn a little bit about pregnancy but the four girls also become great friends, bonding over songs by The Ronettes and The Dixie Cups. Norma has her baby and it is taken away from her to be adopted, causing her to suffer from stress and have hallucinations that her baby is still there, with her. In the end, Mary gives birth to a girl and is helped by Queenie in the delivery, whom we find out has already had a baby before. The baby girl is named Lucy. Lucy then gets taken away from Mary and is given to an adoptive family. The play ends with Mary leaving Lucy her teddy bear as something to remember her by.

Be My Baby was first performed by the Soho Theatre Company at the Pleasance Theatre in London in 1998. Since its initial production, the play has been revived many times including at the Soho Theatre, Salisbury Playhouse, Oldham Coliseum, New Vic Theatre and Hull Truck Theatre.

Soundtrack
"Be My Baby"- The Ronettes
"Chapel of Love"- The Dixie Cups
"Past, Present and Future"- The Shangri-Las
"So Young"- The Ronettes
"Not Too Young To Get Married"-Bob B. Soxx & the Blue Jeans

References 

1997 plays